Jean-Michel Sama Lukonde Kyenge (born 4 August 1977) is a Congolese politician from the former Katanga Province who has occupied the role of Prime Minister of the Democratic Republic of the Congo since 15 February 2021. He was named the day of the  2021 Congo River disaster. He announced his cabinet on 12 April 2021. He is a member of the Future of Congo party.

Biography 

Lukonde was born on 4 August 1977, in Paris, and is an engineer by training. He is the son of Stéphane Lukonde Kyenge, an important figure in the political scene of his native Katanga who was assassinated in 2001.

After being active in politics as a member of the Avenir du Congo (English, Future of Congo) party, and becoming one of the youngest Deputies at the National Assembly (Democratic Republic of the Congo), Lukonde was named Minister of Youth, Sports, and Leisure in December 2014, during the Joseph Kabila Presidency. He served in this position for 10 months, before resigning to support his party in their opposition to Kabila's bid for a third successive term as President.

In June 2019, Lukonde became the Director-General of Gécamines: one of the largest mining companies in Africa, and the biggest in the Democratic Republic of Congo. He was appointed to this position by President Félix Tshisekedi in June 2019. Prior to this position, he was also deputy general administrator of the Congo National Railway Company, the SNCC.

He was named Prime Minister by Tshisekedi in February 2021. He later named his cabinet.

References 

1977 births
Living people
Prime Ministers of the Democratic Republic of the Congo
People from Paris
21st-century Democratic Republic of the Congo people
21st-century Democratic Republic of the Congo politicians